is a Japanese actor and musician from Toyohashi, Aichi, Japan.

Career 
In 1974, he joined Shintaro Katsu's production company and made his debut with the television series Zatoichi as a guest. For a quarter of a century, he starred in the series The Unfettered Shogun as Tokugawa Yoshimune, the title character. He also played a similar role in Kamen Rider OOO Wonderful.

Other noteworthy roles include Hōjō Yoshitoki in the 1979 NHK series Kusa Moeru, Irobe Matashiro in the 1999 NHK series Genroku Ryoran (involving the chushingura, that is, the story of the Forty-seven rōnin), Shibata Katsuie in the 2002 NHK series Toshiie to Matsu, Ōtomo Sōrin in the 2004 NHK special Ōtomo Sōrin—Kokoro no Ōkoku wo Motomete, and Ōishi Kuranosuke in the 2004 TV Asahi series Chushingura. He also played Asano Takumi no Kami, an important (although brief) role, in an earlier chushingura, making a career of that story. In 2005, he is appearing as Benkei in Yoshitsune, the yearlong NHK Taiga drama. TV Asahi tapped Matsudaira to star as Tōyama no Kin-san in the latest (2007) version of their program of the same name. He appeared in Tokugawa Fūun-roku, the annual jidaigeki spectacular which was shown on TV Tokyo on January 2, 2008.

Matsuken Samba 

Matsudaira is also famous as a singer. His most popular song "Matsuken Samba II" (マツケンサンバII) was released in 2004 and became popular with his fanbase. The song gained national attention because his appearance in the likeness of a person in Edo period with glittery kimono and a hip-swiveling dance became the topic of some television programs, including parodying him on an idol group SMAP's variety show, SMAP×SMAP. The new attention of the media made Matsudaira visible to a younger fanbase. The song became a certified hit, staying on the Oricon Top 100 chart for over a year. A version called  featuring Shu Watanabe (Eiji Hino/Kamen Rider OOO) and Ryosuke Miura (Ankh/Shingo Izumi) was released on August 3, 2011, as an ending theme for the movie Kamen Rider OOO Wonderful: The Shogun and the 21 Core Medals.

Filmography

Film
Baruto no Gakuen (2006)
Kamen Rider OOO Wonderful: The Shogun and the 21 Core Medals (2011) - Tokugawa Yoshimune
Sanada 10 Braves (2016) - Tokugawa Ieyasu
Musashi (2019) - Sasaki Kojirō

Television
 The Unfettered Shogun (1978–2003) – Tokugawa Yoshimune
 Akō Rōshi (1979) – Asano "Takumi no Kami" Naganori
 Kusa Moeru (1979) – Hōjō Yoshitoki
 Taira no Kiyomori (1992) – Taira no Kiyomori
 Unmeitōge (1993) - Akizuki Rokurota
 Benkei (1997) – Musashibō Benkei
 Toshiie and Matsu (2002) – Shibata Katsuie
 Yoshitsune (2005) – Musashibō Benkei
 Samurai Rebellion (2013)
 Naotora: The Lady Warlord (2017) – Takeda Shingen
 The 13 Lords of the Shogun (2022) – Taira no Kiyomori

Theatrical animation
 Doraemon: Nobita's Secret Gadget Museum (2013) - Mustard
 Her Blue Sky (2019) - Dankichi Nitobe

Television animation
 Rowdy Sumo Wrestler Matsutaro!! (2014) - Matsutarō Sakaguchi

Video Games
 Kamen Rider: Battride War 2 (2014) - Tokugawa Yoshimune

Japanese dub
X-Men: Apocalypse (2016) - Apocalypse (Oscar Isaac)

Awards

References

External links
 
Ken Matsudaira profile at Teichiku record company
Ken Matsudaira at NHK

Japanese male actors
1953 births
Living people
People from Toyohashi
Actors from Aichi Prefecture